Morgan Carpenter is a bioethicist, intersex activist and researcher. In 2013 he created the intersex flag, and became president of Intersex Human Rights Australia (formerly OII Australia). He is now a co-executive director. In 2015, he cofounded a project to mark Intersex Awareness Day.

Background 

Carpenter is a graduate of the bioethics program at the University of Sydney and also holds qualifications from the University of Technology, Sydney, Dublin City University and Coventry University. His intersex status was diagnosed as an adult, described as including a diagnosis of "indeterminate sex", and a surgical history.

Activism 

Morgan Carpenter helped found Intersex Human Rights Australia and became president of the organisation in September 2013. Carpenter wrote the organization's submissions to Senate inquiries, appearing before a Senate hearing on anti-discrimination legislation during activities that led to the adoption of an "intersex status" attribute in anti-discrimination law on 1 August 2013, and a Senate committee inquiry on the involuntary or coerced sterilisation of people with disabilities and intersex people.

Carpenter contributes to work on reform of international medical classifications and medical practices within Australia. He is named as a reviewer for a DSD Genetics website funded by the National Health and Medical Research Council, Australia, and has also authored critiques of eugenic selection against intersex traits, and clinical research priorities. He speaks out against stigma, and has spoken out on issues affecting women purported to have intersex traits in competitive sport.

Carpenter took part in the first United Nations expert meeting on ending human rights violations against intersex people in 2015 In the same year, he founded a project to mark Intersex Awareness Day. Carpenter was also a drafting committee member and signatory of the 2017 Yogyakarta Principles plus 10, on the application of international human rights law in relation to sexual orientation, gender identity, gender expression and sex characteristics.

Carpenter has been published by The Guardian, SBS, Australian Broadcasting Corporation, and other media.

Intersex flag 
The Intersex flag was created in July 2013 by Carpenter as a flag "that is not derivative, but is yet firmly grounded in meaning". Describing the flag for Intersex Human Rights Australia, Carpenter wrote:

Academic work 

With recognition of non-binary gender identities in Australian regulations, and German birth certificates, Carpenter expressed concern that such developments are "not a solution" to the needs of intersex people. In 2018, he wrote that:

Carpenter argues that claims that medicalization "saves intersex people" from being framed as the "other", while "legal othering saves intersex people from medicalization are contradictory and empty rhetoric".

In an article on the Yogyakarta Principles and relationships between intersex and LGBT populations, Carpenter stresses inadequacies and "dangerous" consequences from framing intersex as a sexual orientation or gender identity issue, inviting legislative enactment of protections on grounds of sex characteristics.

Selected bibliography

Books and book chapters

Journal articles

Recognition 
In 2013, Australia's Gay News Network included Carpenter in their "LGBTI people to watch in 2014".

References

External links

Living people
Intersex men
Intersex rights activists
Australian activists
1966 births
Intersex rights in Australia
Intersex academics
Intersex writers
Flag designers